Lake Waikare is the largest of several shallow lakes in the upper floodplain of the Waikato River in New Zealand's North Island. It is a riverine lake, located to the east of Te Kauwhata and 40 kilometres north of Hamilton.

Due to its shallow nature (its depth is never more than two metres) and the heavy use of fertiliser in the surrounding farming district, the waters of the lake are in poor condition. A 2010 report showed that of all the measured lakes it had the highest trophic level index, a measurement of the amount of pollutants. Pollution also comes from Te Kauwhata sewage works, which is subject to a Regional Council abatement notice for excessive discharges of Kjeldahl Nitrogen, Total Nitrogen, Total Phosphorus and E. coli. A health warning was issued in 2020 for cyanobacteria.

References

External links
Lake Waikare at Lake Ecosystem Restoration New Zealand

Lakes of Waikato
Waikato District